The British Figure Skating Championships (known in some years as the British Ice Figure and Dance Championships and the British Ice Figure & Synchronized Skating Championships) are a figure skating competition held annually to crown the national champions of the United Kingdom. Figure skaters compete in the disciplines of men's singles, ladies' singles, pair skating, and ice dancing. Not all disciplines have been held in every year due to a lack of participants.

The competition is typically held in November or December; thus, for example, the 1962 Championships were held in November 1961 as part of the 1961–62 season. The dance Championships have often been held as a separate event in a different location than the singles and pairs competitions.

The British Championships have been open to skaters from Commonwealth countries, and skaters from Canada and Australia, in particular, have entered in some years. Before the establishment of a ladies' category in 1927, female skaters would occasionally compete in the men's event.

Senior medalists

Men

Women

Pairs

Ice dance

Junior medalists

Men

Women

Pairs

Ice dance

Advanced novice medalists

Boys

Girls

Pairs

Ice dance

Intermediate novice medalists

Men

Ladies

Ice dance

Basic novice medalists

Men

Ladies

Pairs

Ice dance

References

Sources
 Ice Skating Australia international results
 "The British Championships", Skating magazine, Feb 1960
 "The British Championships", Skating magazine, Feb 1962
 "The British Championships, 1962", Skating magazine, Feb 1963
 "From Abroad", Skating magazine, Feb 1966
 "Newsmakers", Skating magazine, Jan 1970 
 "Newsmakers", Skating magazine, Feb 1970
 "Fall results", Skating magazine, Jan 1971
 "Newsmakers", Skating magazine, Jan 1972

External links
 1997–2004 results
 2005–2010 results

 

 
United Kingdom
British Championships
Sports competitions in the United Kingdom
Annual sporting events in the United Kingdom
National championships in the United Kingdom